Century Textile and Industries is a textile and paper manufacturing and export company based in Mumbai. The main business activity involves manufacture of cotton textiles, yarn, denim, viscose filament rayon yarn, tire-cords, caustic soda, sulphuric acid, salt, pulp, and paper. The company also has a substantial dominance in the international textile markets and exports its products to more than 45 countries around the globe.

Century Textiles & Industries Limited is an IS/ISO 9001:2000 and ISO 14001 company. The Government of India also awarded it with 'Three Star Export House' status.

History
In 1897, the company was established as Century Textiles Limited and listed on BSE with its Registered Office at Mumbai. Till 1951, the Company operated only one Cotton Textile Mill in Mumbai.

In 1956, Company began its Rayon Division at Kalyan, near Mumbai to manufacture Viscose Filament Rayon Yarn.

The Company diversified into production of Cement by establishing its first cement plant at Baikunth, near Raipur (Chhattisgarh) in 1974.

The textile mill stopped the production in Mumbai in 2006 due to increase in operating costs. The new plant in Jhagadia, District. Bharuch became functional in 2009 with the name Birla Century and is producing only fine and finer fabrics in 100% Cotton fabrics.
The company has exclusive showrooms across India in Mumbai, Delhi, Jaipur, Kota, Ahmedabad etc.

References

Manufacturing companies based in Mumbai
Textile companies based in Maharashtra
Conglomerate companies of India
Manufacturing companies established in 1897
Indian companies established in 1897
Companies listed on the National Stock Exchange of India
Companies listed on the Bombay Stock Exchange